This is a list of all city routes in Winnipeg, Manitoba, Canada. Even-numbered routes run north-south with numbers increasing from east to west and odd-numbered routes run east-west with numbers increasing from north to south.

Expressways
These roads are high capacity limited-access roads serving the city.  The speed limit is mainly .

Major routes
These routes are the high capacity major arterials around the city.  The speed limit is mainly .

Minor routes
These routes connect the major routes, and expressways; they are mainly minor arterial or collector roads.  The speed limit is mainly .

References 

 
Lists of roads in Canada
City Routes
Lists of buildings and structures in Manitoba